The Great Dorset Steam Fair (abbreviated GDSF, and since 2010 also known as The National Heritage Show) is an annual show featuring steam-powered vehicles and machinery. This used to be from the Wednesday after the UK August bank holiday, but from 2016 has been from the Thursday before the Bank Holiday until the Bank Holiday itself. It is reputedly the largest collection of steam and vintage equipment to be seen anywhere in the world.
The fair was founded by the Dorset Steam & Historic Vehicle Club, and has been held in Dorset, England, every summer since 1969. The show is now organised by Michael Oliver's son, Martin Oliver, through Great Dorset Steam Fair Ltd.

History
Following a meeting of like-minded souls held in The Royal Oak in Okeford Fitzpaine, north Dorset, the first fair was held in 1969. For the first 15 years of its existence the steam fair (then known as the 'Great Working of Steam Engines') was held at Stourpaine Bushes, then in 1985 it temporarily moved to nearby Everley Hill, as Bushes Farm were delayed in harvesting the crops from the fields used by the steam fair due to the weather conditions. In 1988, after three years at Everley Hill, where access by large crowds was difficult, it moved to its current permanent home at Tarrant Hinton, north of Blandford Forum, where access is vastly improved. The fair now attracts up to 200,000 visitors. In 2020, the event was cancelled for the first time since its inception due to the  COVID-19 pandemic.

Exhibits

The most numerous exhibits are traction engines, tractors and farm machinery, but there are also sections for classic cars and commercial vehicles, working shire horses, rustic crafts, 'bygones' displays, and more.  The show also has a market, autojumble, live music and funfair (some of which is powered by the steam engines).  The funfair has traditional rides such as gallopers and steam boats, as well as modern ones like the "World Fair Wheel" which was sited in Manchester for the millennium. It is the biggest gathering of fairground organs in the UK.

The show regularly attracts around 200,000 visitors, and there can be 30,000 people on site, making the fair the fifth largest population centre in Dorset, after Bournemouth, Poole, Weymouth and Christchurch (the population of the historic town of Dorchester being only half that number).

A speciality of the show is the display of traction engines and steam rollers performing the work for which they were designed. Such displays include heavy haulage, threshing, sawing logs, ploughing and road-making. The main arena of the show is purposely sited on the slope of a hill to allow both steam- and internal combustion-powered machinery to demonstrate their capacity for heavy load hauling. One of the main displays is the "Showman's Line up", in the vintage fairground section, which is thought to be the largest collection of showman's engines in the world. More than 60 showman's engines were present in 2004. 

Since 2003, the show has contracted its own radio station, Steam Fair FM, broadcasting 24 hours daily on 87.9 FM from the Sunday prior to the show, to the Tuesday following – ten days in all. The station, which is also streamed on the internet, covers show news and views, weather and other relevant information with plenty of listener dedications and a format of "Vintage Hits". During the event, the station is advertised on roads in the surrounding area and provides traffic news for drivers using the A354 Blandford to Salisbury road that passes the show site. 
For the 40th anniversary, in 2008, the organisers recreated the very first fair, by tracing all of the exhibits that were displayed at the 1969 show.

Directors' Thanksgiving Service
The end of the fair used to be marked with the Director's Thanksgiving Service on the Sunday, at 12 noon, which took place on the stage of Dean's Bioscope, organised for many years by Chris Edmonds, the Lay Chaplain until his death in 2007. The Rev'd Dr Michael Foster, a friend of Chris, and the local Rector of Tarrant Hinton, continued to organise the Thanksgiving Service, with Sally, Chris' widow. Fr Michael was appointed Chaplain to the Show at the Thanksgiving Service September 2011, having been Assistant Chaplain for some four years. It was Fr Michael who conducted the founder of the Fair, Michael Oliver's Funeral in 2009. The Directors' Thanksgiving Service is now organised to begin the Show, on the opening Wednesday, as was the practice in some past years.

Dorset Sound Festival

2008 saw the start of the Dorset Sound Festival, a music event that is held alongside the main fair, designed to entertain a wide variety of musical tastes. The festival included five stages: the Main Stage, Real Ale Stage, Folk Stage, Country & Western Marquee and the Black Bull Marquee. Bands featured were mainly tribute acts, including the Bootleg Beatles.

In 2009, the Main Stage was changed from being inside a marquee to an outdoor concert stage. This required a concert ticket to be purchased unlike the other marquees that are free to visitors of the fair. 2009 saw the start of a new event called Steam Sounds that showcases unsigned artists from around the local area on the outdoor stage. The Main Stage is now free to all and does not require a ticket for entry as of 2014

World Records
On 31 August 2013, GDSF set a new World Record for the largest parade of steam rollers, when 103 rollers were driven into the main arena for a photo call. The previous record had been set by GDSF in 2003 with 32 steam rollers. The requirements for the record attempt, which took place on a newly created 80m-long (260 ft) section of road at the showground, included the fact the vehicles had to be moving.  The citation from Guinness World Records is as follows:

A regular section of the fair is the road making demonstration, where workers in period costume use vintage equipment to demonstrate how roads were built before the invention of tarmacadam, using crushed stone. An extra section of road was built during the 2013 show, for the purpose of breaking the record: "greatest number of steam rollers going over a newly laid piece of road". The 103 steam rollers, and a large number of diesel rollers, were all driven over the new section of road before continuing to the main arena. "Lord Jellicoe", a Fowler formerly owned by the founder of the fair, Michael Oliver, was the 33rd roller in the procession and hence the first to break the record. Also taking part in the parade was "Betsy", the Aveling & Porter roller restored by steeplejack, Fred Dibnah.

The 2001 event also saw the public debut of the home-built Hudspith Steam Bicycle.

Founding Members 
Michael Oliver was not the sole founder of the Great Dorset Steam Fair, and was a member of a dedicated group of enthusiasts.  

The list is as follows;

President; Mr G. J. Romanes, M.A, M.R.C.S, D.O.M.S.

Vice President; Mr E.C. Hines.

Chairman; Mr J. E. B. Pocock

Vice Chairman; Mr M. F. Oliver

Treasurer; Mr N. J. Fincham

Public relations officer; Mr A. Imber.

Joint secretaries; Mr & Mrs J. Cluet.

Sub committee for the event;

T. M. Abbot, J. Antell, A. S. Braddick, J. Cluet, A. W. Field, G. A. Fincham, N. J. Fincham. F. Franklin, S. J. Garrett, H. Gray, E. C. Hine, A. Imber, G. J. Romanes.

Secretary M. F. Oliver.

This list has been taken from the Souvenir  Program and guide from the first very first show dated September 1969.

See also
List of steam fairs
Steam Era

References

External links

 Official website
 Music Festival
 BBC Dorset 2008 report
 BBC Dorset report on 37th Fair (2005)

Recurring events established in 1968
Festivals in Dorset
Steam festivals
September events
Autumn events in England